Viola lutea, the mountain pansy, is a species of violet that grows in Europe, from the British Isles to the Balkans.

Description

Taxonomy
Viola lutea was first described by William Hudson in his 1762 Flora Anglica.

V. lutea subsp. lutea is native to central and north-western Europe, from the British Isles to Austria; another subspecies occurs further east, from Hungary to the Balkans.

Two very special subspecies are V. lutea subsp. calaminaria which occurs in the southernmost Netherlands and eastern Belgium, and V. lutea subsp. westfalica, which only occurs at an  extremely small locality near  in East Westphalia, Germany. Both taxa have relatively recently evolved to take advantage of the local pollution left over after centuries of mining for metals in these locations. The subspecies calaminaria grows in areas where the mine tailings for zinc ore have been dumped, and the subspecies westfalica grows on heaps of lead ore waste. Both taxa have managed to become the dominant plant species in their extremely small habitats.

Distribution

Uses
Viola lutea is the main progenitor for the common cultivated garden pansy, V. × wittrockiana. This hybrid was created by gardeners in Britain in the early 19th century.

References

External links

lutea
Flora of Europe
Plants described in 1762